Henning Eiler (Ejler) Petersen (22 August 1877 – 22 May 1946) was a Danish mycologist, botanist and marine biologist. He made a major contribution to unveiling the mysterious die-back of eel grass in Northern European waters in the early 20th century as a pathogen outbreak.

Petersen's main research was in what was then known as lower fungi – Chytridiomycota and Oomycetes, but he also studied the systematics of Red algae. Parallel to these lines of research, he investigated the intraspecific morphological variation in plant species – which would today be called quantitative genetics.

The Oomycete genus Petersenia is named to his honour.

Selected scientific bibliography
 Petersen, H.E. (1903) Notes sur les Phycomycètes observés dans les téguments vides des nymphes de Phryganées avec description de trios espèces nouvelles de Chytridinées. Journal de Botanique 17 (6–7): 214–222.
 Petersen, H.E. (1905) Contributions à la connaissance des Phycomycètes marins (Chrytridinæ Fischer). Oversigt over det Kongelige Danske Videnskabernes Selskabs Forhandlinger 1905 (5): 439–488  
 Petersen, H.E. (1908) Danske Arter af Slægten Ceramium (Roth) Lyngbye [with French summary]. Kongelige Danske Videnskabernes Selskabs Skrifter - Naturvidenskabelig og Mathematisk Afdeling, 7.Rk., vol. 5 (2).
 Petersen, H.E. (1908) The structure and biology of Arctic flowering plants (ed. E. Warming. 1. Ericinæ (Ericaceae, Pirolaceae). 2. The biological anatomy of them leaves and stems. Meddelelser om Grønland 36: 73–138.
 Petersen, H.E. (1908) The structure and biology of Arctic flowering plants (ed. E. Warming. 2. Diapensiaceae. Diapensia lapponica. Meddelelser om Grønland 36: 139–154.
 Petersen, H.E. (1910) An account of Danish freshwater Phycomycetes, with biological and systematical remarks. Annales Mycologici 8: 494–560.
 Ostenfeld, C.H. & Petersen, H.E. (1930) On a new Plasmodiophoracea found in Canada. Zeitschrift für Botanik 23: 13–18.
 Petersen, H. E. (1915) Indledende Studier over Polymorfien hos Anthriscus silvestris (L.) Hoffm. Dansk Botanisk Arkiv 1: 1–150.
 Petersen, H.E. (1924) Studier over Polymorphien hos Vaccinium uliginosum. Botanisk Tidsskrift 38 (3).
 Petersen, H.E. (1921) Nogle Studier over Pimpinella saxifraga L. Botanisk Tidsskrift 37: 222–240.
 Petersen, H.E. (1922) Études ultérieures sur la polymorphie de l'Anthriscus silvester (L.) Hoffm. Dansk Botanisk Arkiv 4: 1–28.
 Petersen, H.E. (1926) Über die Variation der Potentilla erecta (L.) Dalla Torre. Botanisk Tidsskrift 39: 368–374.
 Petersen, H.E. (1933) Wasting disease in eel grass (Zostera marina). Nature 134: 143–144.
 Petersen, H.E. (1935) Preliminary report on the disease of eel-grass (Zostera marina L.). Report from the Danish Biological Station 40: 3–8.

References

1877 births
1946 deaths
20th-century Danish botanists
Danish mycologists
Danish marine biologists